Marcin Kamiński (born 15 January 1992) is a Polish professional footballer who plays as a centre-back for Bundesliga club Schalke 04 and the Poland national team.

Club career

Lech Poznań
Kamiński made his professional debut for Lech Poznań in the Ekstraklasa on 21 November 2009, coming on as a substitute in the 90th minute for Jakub Wilk in a 3–1 home win against Ruch Chorzów. He played a total of over 200 matches for the club and won two championships (2009–10 and 2014–15).

VfB Stuttgart
For the 2016–17 season Kamiński moved to VfB Stuttgart. On 5 March 2018, he extended his contract with Stuttgart until June 2021.

Loan to Fortuna Düsseldorf
On 24 August 2018, Kamiński was loaned out to Fortuna Düsseldorf until the end of the season.

Schalke 04
On 27 May 2021, Schalke 04 announced the signing of Kamiński on a free transfer for the new season.

International career
In May 2018 Kamiński was named in the Poland national team's preliminary 35-man squad for the 2018 FIFA World Cup in Russia. Although he did not initially make the 23-man squad going to Russia, he remained with the team as a standby player for the injured Kamil Glik. Glik was eventually declared fit to play at the World Cup, and thus Kamiński did not travel with the team to Russia.

Career statistics

Club

International

Honours
Lech Poznań
 Ekstraklasa: 2009–10, 2014–15
 Polish Super Cup: 2015

VfB Stuttgart
 2. Bundesliga: 2016–17

Schalke 04
 2. Bundesliga: 2021–22

References

External links

 Profile at the FC Schalke 04 website
 
 

1992 births
Living people
People from Konin
Sportspeople from Greater Poland Voivodeship
Polish footballers
Association football central defenders
Poland international footballers
Poland youth international footballers
Poland under-21 international footballers
UEFA Euro 2012 players
Lech Poznań players
VfB Stuttgart players
Fortuna Düsseldorf players
FC Schalke 04 players
Ekstraklasa players
Bundesliga players
2. Bundesliga players
Polish expatriate footballers
Polish expatriate sportspeople in Germany
Expatriate footballers in Germany